Stobna  is a village in the administrative district of Gmina Nowy Dwór Gdański, within Nowy Dwór Gdański County, Pomeranian Voivodeship, in northern Poland.

The village has a population of 340.

Notable residents
Ewald Lindloff (27 September 1908 – 2 May 1945), officer

References

Stobna